Robert Sumpter was the Dean of Exeter between 1363 and 1378.

Notes

Deans of Exeter

14th-century English clergy